Calmette is a surname. Notable people with the surname include:

Antoine de Bosc de la Calmette (1752–1803), Danish governor and landscape architect
Albert Calmette ForMemRS (1863–1933), French physician, bacteriologist, immunologist, officer of the Pasteur Institute
Gaston Calmette (1858–1914), French journalist
Jean Calmette (1692–1740), French Jesuit missionary in South India, Indologist

See also
Bacillus Calmette-Guérin (BCG), vaccine against tuberculosis
Calmette Hospital (l'hôpital Calmette), public hospital on Monivong Boulevard in Phnom Penh
Calmette Bay, small bay between Camp Point and Cape Calmette, on the west coast of Graham Land
Cape Calmette, western extremity of a rocky peninsula projecting from the west coast of Graham Land
La Calmette, commune in the Gard department in southern France
Grand Noir de la Calmette, red wine hybrid grape, a cross between Aramon and Petit Bouschet
Calum Bett
Calumet (disambiguation)
Calumetite